This is a list of what are intended to be the notable top hotels by country, five or four star hotels, notable skyscraper landmarks or historic hotels which are covered in multiple reliable publications. It should not be a directory of every hotel in every country:

Georgia

 Hotel Ambasadori, Tbilisi
 Hotel Intourist Palace, Batumi
 Radisson Blu Iveria Hotel, Tbilisi
 Sheraton Metechi Palace Hotel, Tbilisi
 Tbilisi Marriott Hotel, Tbilisi

Germany

Gibraltar
Bristol Hotel
Caleta Hotel
The Rock Hotel

Greece
 Grande Bretagne, Athens
 Hilton Athens, Athens
 Makedonia Palace, Thessaloniki
 Porto Carras, Sithonia
 President Hotel Athens, Athens
 Xenia

Greenland

Guam
Hotel Nikko Guam, Tumon

Guatemala

 Hotel Casa Santo Domingo, Antigua Guatemala
 Hotel Museo Uxlabil, Antigua Guatemala
 Porta Hotel Antigua, Antigua Guatemala
 Tikal Futura, Guatemala City

Guinea
Hotel Camayene, Conakry
Hotel de France, Conakry
Le Meridien Mariador Palace, Conakry
Novotel Ghi Conakry, Conakry

Guinea-Bissau
Hotel Hotti Bissau, Bissau

References

G